Yaydzhi or Yaudzhi or Yayji or Yəyci or Yaycı may refer to:
Zovaber, Gegharkunik, Armenia
Zovaber, Syunik, Armenia
Yaycı, Azerbaijan
Aşağı Yayci, Azerbaijan
Yuxarı Yayci, Azerbaijan
Yājī-ye Āz̄arbāyjān, Azerbaijan 
Yaycı, Iğdır, Turkey